Total may refer to:

Mathematics
 Total, the summation of a set of numbers
 Total order, a partial order without incomparable pairs
 Total relation, which may also mean
 connected relation (a binary relation in which any two elements are comparable).
 Total function, a partial function that is also a total relation

Business
 TotalEnergies, a French petroleum company
 Total (cereal), a food brand by General Mills
 Total, a brand of strained yogurt made by Fage
 Total, a database management system marketed by Cincom Systems 
 Total Linhas Aéreas - a brazilian airline
 Total, a line of dental products by Colgate

Music and culture
 Total (group), an American R&B girl group
 Total: From Joy Division to New Order, a compilation album
 Total (Sebastian album)
 Total (Total album)
 Total (Teenage Bottlerocket album)
 Total (Seigmen album)
 Total (Wanessa album)
 Total (Belinda Peregrín album)
 Total 1, an annual compilation album
 Total, the one time recording name of British musician Matthew Bower
 Total!, a British videogames magazine

Sports
 Total (football club)

See also
 
 Total war, a large-scale military conflict
 Totaled, the write-off of a damaged vehicle on cost grounds
 Totally (disambiguation)